Stefan Norris (1894–1979) was a Polish-born art director. He designed the sets for more than a hundred films. After the Invasion of Poland during the Second World War he settled and worked in Romania.

Selected filmography
 Robert and Bertram (1938)
 The Valley Resounds (1950)
 In Our Village (1951)
 Titanic Waltz (1964)

References

Bibliography 
 Hames, Peter. The Cinema Of Central Europe. Wallflower Press, 2004.

External links 
 

1894 births
1979 deaths
Polish emigrants to Romania
Polish art directors
Film people from Warsaw